Stephen Rider is an American film and television actor. He is known for playing Blake Tower in the Marvel series Daredevil, Admiral Stephen W. Rochon in the film The Butler, and Eric Millworth in the ABC series Lucky 7.

Career 
Rider was discovered by Denzel Washington in a play in 2006, and Washington brought him into his 2007 biographical drama film The Great Debaters, which was Rider's feature film debut.

In 2013, Rider played the role of Seeker Reed in the science fiction film The Host and later played the role of Admiral Stephen W. Rochon in the historical drama The Butler. Rider played the role of Eric Millworth in the ABC's drama series Lucky 7. He also starred in the film Alpha Alert, also known as Event 15.

In 2015, Rider appeared in the Showtime's comedy series Shameless as G-Dog. He also starred as Eli Cunningham in the CBS' comedy series Battle Creek.

Rider appeared in the 2nd season of Netflix's series Daredevil based on Marvel Comics, as Blake Tower, an Assistant District Attorney for New York City.

Filmography

Film

Television

References

External links 
 

Living people
African-American male actors
American male film actors
American male television actors
21st-century American male actors
Place of birth missing (living people)
21st-century African-American people
1979 births